

This is a list of the National Register of Historic Places listings in Cumberland County, Maine.

This is intended to be a complete list of the properties and districts on the National Register of Historic Places in Cumberland County, Maine, United States. Latitude and longitude coordinates are provided for many National Register properties and districts; these locations may be seen together in a map.

There are 245 properties and districts listed on the National Register in the county, including 12 National Historic Landmarks. 150 of these properties and districts, including 5 National Historic Landmarks, are located outside Portland, and are listed here, while the properties and districts in Portland are listed separately.  Two once-listed properties outside Portland have been removed.

Current listings

Portland

Outside Portland

|}

Former listing

|}

See also

 List of National Historic Landmarks in Maine
 National Register of Historic Places listings in Maine

References

 
Cumberland
Buildings and structures in Cumberland County, Maine
Cumberland County, Maine
Protected areas of Cumberland County, Maine